Saint-Dizier-l'Évêque (German: Sankt Störingen) is a commune in the Territoire de Belfort department in Bourgogne-Franche-Comté in northeastern France.

Geography

Climate
Saint-Dizier-l'Évêque has a oceanic climate (Köppen climate classification Cfb).

See also
Communes of the Territoire de Belfort department

References

Communes of the Territoire de Belfort